The Gordon Public School is a heritage-listed former government public school located at 799 Pacific Highway, in the Sydney suburb of Gordon in the Ku-ring-gai Council local government area of New South Wales, Australia. The school was opened in 1871 and closed in 1989. The property was transferred to community use and is owned by Ku-ring-gai Council. It was added to the New South Wales State Heritage Register on 2 April 1999.

History 

Between 1871 and 1885 the school was known as the Lane Cove School. The denominational Wesleyan School at Lane Cove was in 1871 converted into a public school. The enrolment was then 54 children.

This school continued to be held in the old Wesleyan chapel until 1877. In March 1876, a site fronting Lane Cove Road (now known as Pacific Highway) was acquired at a cost of A£30, but portion of this ground was subsequently resumed by the Railway Department in 1888: but the Instruction Department secured an additional area for £318, and a further area was conveyed in 1891. The name of the school was in 1885 changed from Lane Cove School to Gordon Public School. In 1877 a tender for new school buildings and residence was accepted for the sum of £1,957, which were completed and opened in August of that year. At the official opening of a new wing at the school by the Minister of Public Instruction, The Hon. Jacob Garrard MP, in 1897 it was reported that the school afforded accommodation for 98 pupils. In 1888 further additions were made at a cost of £207. It gave accommodation for 100 pupils. With the old building there was accommodation for 220 children. The enrolment of the school for March 1897 was 205, with an average attendance of 143. The total cost of land and buildings amounted to £3,351.

Notable alumni
Lewis Yelland Andrews, soldier and colonial official.
Bill Bradfield, civil and aviation engineer.
Philip Cox , architect
Harold Farncomb, RAN officer and admiral.
Raymond Kershaw, army officer, banker and diplomat.
Sir Marcus Loane, Anglican archbishop of Sydney.
Arthur Wheen, soldier, translator and librarian.

Description

Heritage listing 
Gordon Public School was listed on the New South Wales State Heritage Register on 2 April 1999.

See also 

Australian non-residential architectural styles

References

Attribution 

New South Wales State Heritage Register
Gordon, New South Wales
Articles incorporating text from the New South Wales State Heritage Register
1871 establishments in Australia
School buildings completed in 1871
1989 disestablishments in Australia
Defunct schools in Sydney
Educational institutions disestablished in 1989